The 2008 Girls' Youth South American Volleyball Championship was the 16th edition of the tournament, organised by South America's governing volleyball body, the Confederación Sudamericana de Voleibol (CSV). Held in Lima and Pucallpa in Peru. The top two teams qualified for the 2009 Youth World Championship.

Competing nations
The following national teams participated in the tournament, teams were seeded according to how they finished in the previous edition of the tournament with host Peru being seeded first:

First round

Pool A
Venue: Coliseo Cerrado de Pucallpa, Pucallpa, Peru

|}

|}

Pool B
Venue: Coliseo Eduardo Dibos, Lima, Peru

|}

|}

Final round
Venue: Coliseo Eduardo Dibos, Lima, Peru

Championship bracket

Semifinals

|}

7th place match

|}

5th place match

|}

Bronze medal match

|}

Gold medal match

|}

Final standing

Individual awards

Most Valuable Player

Best Spiker

Best Blocker

Best Server

Best Digger

Best Setter

Best Receiver

Best Libero

References

External links
CSV official website

2008
S
Volleyball
International volleyball competitions hosted by Peru